Pancrinol was a medicine made from liver, spleen, kidney, and adrenal extracts from slaughter animals.  It was manufactured by the laboratories of Dr. François Debat in Paris. This drug was presented, in drinkable ampoules, as a tonic against anemia, tuberculosis, and all organic deficiencies.  It was used as a doping agent in cycling.

Bibliography
 Revue Art et Médecine, no. 1, Octobre 1930
Sport et dopage : la grande hypocrisie, François Bellocq avec la collaboration de Serge Bressan, éditions du Félin, 1991

Patent medicines